Bates Round Barn is a historic round barn at Greene in Chenango County, New York. It was built in 1928 and is a three-story structure, with attic, and a diameter of 60 feet.  It is covered by a domical roof and the interior silo, built of tile, is topped by a ventilator. DeVern Bates also built the nearby Young Round Barn.

It was added to the National Register of Historic Places in 1984.

References

Round barns in New York (state)
Barns on the National Register of Historic Places in New York (state)
Infrastructure completed in 1928
Buildings and structures in Chenango County, New York
National Register of Historic Places in Chenango County, New York